Erich Heins (born 1 November 1907 in Hamburg; died 26 June 1944 in Hamburg Remand Prison) was a German communist and resistance fighter against the Nazis and a Nazi Victim.

Life 
Heins came from a Hamburg worker family. After visiting the elementary school, he learned the trade of Locksmith  and worked in the shipyard of Blohm & Voss. He entered the Communist Party (KPD), then joined the Roter Frontkämpferbund (RFB) and was active against the upcoming Nazism. After the transfer of power to the NSDAP he continued this illegal activity. When the Gestapo  became aware that in his apartment the Rotfrontkämpfer conspiratorial met, he was taken for three months in "protective custody"

In the early 1940s he took at the shipyard, where he worked, connection to the resistance group Bästlein Jacob Abshagen who were interested in foreign forced labor he used that have been supplied in the war from Eastern Europe. Political Enlightenment about the actual war events and sabotage negotiations among their resistance activities. When this power the Nazi authorities had become known through treachery, Hein and several other of his associates were arrested in May 1944 and in the "Hamburg Communists processes " from the People's Court sentenced to death. Erich Hein was executed on 26 June 1944, along with Karl Kock, Hans Köpke, Ernst Mittelbach, Walter Reber, Wilhelm Stein, Paul Thürey, Kurt Vopahl and Oskar Voss Detention  Holsten glacis  executed with the guillotine.

Links 
 note to execution Retrieved August 24, 2011

References 

People from Hamburg executed by Nazi Germany
1907 births
1944 deaths
Executed communists in the German Resistance
People executed by Nazi Germany by guillotine